Albert Law (28 December 1872 – 22 October 1956) was a British Labour Party politician.

Law was born in Bolton, and worked as a cotton spinner in the town.  He became active in the Bolton and District Operative Cotton Spinners' Provincial Association, serving as it president from 1916 to 1918 and then again from 1920 to 1922.  He was also active in the Labour Party, serving as president of Bolton Trades Council and Labour Party.

He was a Member of Parliament (MP) for Bolton, a two-member constituency, from 1923 to 1924, and again from 1929 to 1931.  He stood again in 1935 but was unsuccessful.

Law also served as a Methodist preacher.

References 

Labour Party (UK) MPs for English constituencies
People from Bolton
UK MPs 1923–1924
UK MPs 1929–1931
1872 births
1956 deaths
United Textile Factory Workers' Association-sponsored MPs